Hasan 'Ali, also called Hasan 'Ali Beg (Azerbaijani: حسن‌علی بیگ; Persian: حسنعلی بیگ; died 1468) — was the last effective ruler of the Qara Qoyunlu Turkmen tribal federation, ruling for just one year from 1467 to 1468.

Rebellions 
He was a son of Jahan Shah and several times imprisoned by his father due to his rebellious nature. He rebelled in 1458, but upon hearing Jahan Shah's return from Herat, he fled to Maku. After being granted amnesty due to his mother, he joined Uzun Hasan. However, he was banished soon after and joined his brother Pirbudag in Isfahan. Brothers rebelled again in 1459. They were crushed and again granted amnesty by Jahan Shah who was under influence of their mother. Their final rebellion in 1464 was disastrous, Pir Budaq was executed and Hasan Ali was again imprisoned in Maku.

Reign 
After his father's death, he was freed by some amirs and declared sultan. After ascending the throne, he invited Abu Sa'id Mirza to join forces against Uzun Hasan. Meanwhile, in Tabriz, Qara Iskander's daughters Arayish and Shahsaray declared their brother Husayn Ali to be new sultan. His brother Qasim beg who was ruling Kerman also rebelled. Hasan Ali crushed all opposition, to the point of putting Qasim beg, his step-mother Jan Begüm and his maternal uncles Qasim and Hamza to death.

However, Hasan Ali was soon captured by Ughurlu Muhammad, heir apparent of Uzun Hasan and put to death. However, according to Faruk Sümer, he committed suicide.

Aftermath 
One of Jahan Shah's emirs - Pirali beg Baharlu declared Mirza Yusuf to be sultan after his death.

References

See also

1468 deaths
Year of birth unknown
Qara Qoyunlu rulers